Danaus chrysippus, also known as the plain tiger, African queen, or African monarch, is a medium-sized butterfly widespread in Asia, Australia and Africa. It belongs to the Danainae subfamily of the brush-footed butterfly family Nymphalidae. Danainae primarily consume plants in the genus Asclepias, more commonly called milkweed. Milkweed contains toxic compounds, cardenolides, which are often consumed and stored by many butterflies. Because of their emetic properties, the plain tiger is unpalatable to most predators. As a result, its coloration is widely mimicked by other species of butterflies. The plain tiger inhabits a wide variety of habitats, although it is less likely to thrive in jungle-like conditions and is most often found in drier, wide-open areas.

D. chrysippus encompasses three main subspecies: D. c. alcippus, D. c. chrysippus, and D. c. orientis. These subspecies are found concentrated in specific regions within the larger range of the entire species.

The plain tiger is believed to be one of the first butterflies depicted in art. A 3,500-year-old ancient Egyptian fresco in Luxor features the oldest known illustration of this species.

Description 
The body is black with many white spots. The wings are orange, the upperside brighter and richer than the underside. The apical half of the forewing is black with a white band. The hindwing has three black spots in the center. The wings are bordered in black and outlined with semicircular white spots. This species exhibits slight sexual dimorphism, as the Male has large scent glands on his hindwings, which the female lacks. They appear as a large black spot with a white centre if viewed from the underside

D. chrysippus is a polymorphic species, so the exact coloring and patterning vary within and between populations.

It is similar in appearance to the Indian fritillary (Argynnis hyperbius), which may coexist with it.

Geographic range 
The plain tiger is found across the entirety of Africa, where the predominant subspecies is D. c. alcippus. Its range extends across the majority of Asia throughout Indian subcontinent, as well as many south Pacific islands. The plain tiger is even present in parts of Australia. D. c. chrysippus is most common throughout Asia and in some select regions in Africa, while D. c. orientis is present in more tropical African regions as well as some African islands, including Madagascar and the Seychelles.
It is also found in Southern Europe and Kuwait. These insects are considered bioinvaders in North America.

Habitat 
The plain tiger prefers arid, open areas, and is found in a variety of habitats, including deserts, mountains, deciduous forests, and human-tended gardens in cities and parks.

Food resources

Larval food plants 
The plain tiger's larval host plants are from several families, most importantly Asclepiadoideae (Apocynaceae):
 Asclepias – milkweeds (recorded on A. cancellata, A. coarctata, A. curassavica, A. fulva, A. kaessneri, A. lineolata, A. physocarpa, A. reflexa, A. scabrifolia, A. semilunata, A. stenophylla, A. swynnertonii, A.syriaca)
 Aspidoglossum interruptum
 Calotropis – mudar (recorded on C. gigantea, C. procera)
 Caralluma burchardii (recorded from Canary Islands/Spain)
 Ceropegia dichotoma (recorded from Canary Islands/Spain)
 Cryptolepis buchananii
 Cynanchum (recorded on C. abyssinicum, C. acutum, C. altiscandens, C. amplexicaule, C. carnosum, C. floribundum, C. sublanceolatum)
 Gomphocarpus fruticosus
 Kanahia laniflora
 Leichardtia australis
 Leptadenia hastata
 Marsdenia leichhardtiana
 Metaplexis japonica
 Orbea variegata (recorded from Canary Islands/Spain)
 Oxystelma pulchellum
 Pentatropis (recorded on P. atropurpurea, P. quinquepartita)
 Pergularia daemia
 Periploca linearifolia
 Pleurostelma cernuum
 Secamone (recorded on S. afzelii, S. parvifolia, S. platystigma)
 Stapelia gigantea
 Stathmostelma (recorded on S. gigantiflorum, S. pedunculatum)
 Vincetoxicum (recorded on V. tanakae, V. sylvaticum)
Host plants from other families include Dyerophytum indicum (Plumbaginaceae), Ficus (Moraceae; recorded on F. laevis, F. racemosa), Ipomoea (Convolvulaceae; recorded on I. alba, I. bona-nox), Lepisanthes rubiginosa (Sapindaceae) as well as some Euphorbiaceae, Malvaceae, Poaceae, Rosaceae and Scrophulariaceae.

Adult food plants 
Adult plain tiger butterflies obtain nectar from various flowering plants. The particular plants available vary depending on the geographic range of the butterfly population and the season, as certain plants do not flower throughout the entire year.

India 
 Catharanthus roseus
 Lantana camara
 Vernonia cinerea
 Tridax procumbens
 Asystasia gangetica
 Antigonon leptopus, January through April and August through December
 Tecoma stans, May through December
 Heliotropium indicum

Australia 
 Goodenia maidenian
 Eucalyptus conglobata
 E. oleosa
 Ptilotis obovata
 Asclepias
 Lantana
 Leucopogon
 Daviesia
In addition to nectar, adult plain tigers obtain pyrrolizidine alkaloids from the dead stems of different plant types. In Australia, the following plants have been identified as sources of pyrrolizidine alkaloids for D. chrysippus:
 Parsonsia eucalyptophylla
 P. straminea
 Echium plantogineum
 Senecio pterophorus
 Heliotropium amplexicaule

Parental care

Oviposition 
Females lay eggs singly on the underside of the leaves of a larval food plant. The eggs are most often laid close to the ground.

Life history

Egg 

When first laid it is white, but gradually turns brown over time. The egg is ridged and dome-shaped. Depending on temperature, the egg is typically hatched in 3–5 days.

Caterpillar 
The larvae of D. chrysippus proceeds through five instar stages. This coloration remains for the final three instar stages. Depending on temperature, the larval stage can last from 12 to 20 days.

Prepupal and pupal stages 
Before pupation, the caterpillar will become motionless and cease feeding. Its color shifts slightly from gray to brown, and it may lose a small amount of body mass. The prepupal stage lasts 1–3 days depending on temperature. The pupal stage lasts 9–15 days depending on temperature, and the pupa changes color over this period from a pale green to dark brown.

Adult 
Male and female D. chrysippus butterflies look very similar and are also similar in size. Depending on temperature, males live about 10–15 days and females live about 7–12 days.

Enemies

Predators

Egg and larval predators 
Most predators of the early developmental stages of D. chrysippus are arthropods. Such potential predators include various kinds of spiders, assassin bugs, cockroaches, ladybugs, ants, and mantises. The caterpillars will even  cannibalize each other. Egg and larval mortality is often high; as many as 84% of eggs may be lost to predation and up to 97% of larvae can be lost by the fifth instar, although most larval deaths occur during the third instar.

Adult predators 
The most common predator of adult plain tigers are birds. In eastern Africa, the most common predator is the fiscal shrike L. c. humeralis.

Parasites 
There are several organisms which parasitize the larvae of D. chrysippus. The fly S. flavohalterata of the Family Tachinidae is responsible for small amounts of parasitization in D. chrysippus populations. It is unclear whether the fly oviposits on the eggs of D. chrysippus or whether the fly oviposits on leaves which are then consumed by D. chrysippus larvae. S. flavohalterata does not kill the larvae, and development is normal until the pupal stage, when larvae dies and the parasite emerges from the pupa instead. A. chrysippi, a parasitic wasp of the family Braconidae, oviposits on larvae early in their development and then kills them in the later stages. As many as fifty wasps may emerge from one large caterpillar, and they then pupate on the deceased host. Parasitic wasps of the genus Charops also infest plain tiger populations, likely during the egg or first instar stage, and then kill the larvae in a later instar stage.

Sturmia convergens is also a parasitoid of D. chrysippus.

Diseases 
The plain tiger is infected by a male-killing bacterium called Spiroplasma. Male-killing bacteria are transmitted vertically, from mother to offspring. Female plain tigers infected with Spiroplasma will produce all-female broods, because the bacteria kills infected male offspring during either their embryonic or first larval instar stage. Although male-killing bacteria are uncommon in species which lay eggs singly, experimentally treating infected females with antibiotics restored an even sex ratio to their subsequent broods, thus indicating that it is indeed Spiroplasma which is responsible for all-female broods in D. chrysippus. However, the prevalence of this bacteria in the plain tiger seems to be restricted to east African populations.

Protective coloration and behavior 
The plain tiger is mimicked by several species due to its unpalatability to potential predators. Previously, it was thought that cardenolides obtained from food sources during the larval stage were responsible for the aversive nature of adult D. chrysippus, but many larval food sources lack cardenolides, and some adult West African populations of D. chrysippus do not store cardenolides well, yet still repel predators. More recently, pyrrolizidine alkaloids have been proposed to be also responsible for the unpalatability of D. chrysippus. Adult male danaines often feed on plants containing pyrrolizidine alkaloids, and although females rarely do, they may be protected simply through their resemblance to males of the same species. The ability of D. chrysippus to store cardenolides varies across populations, so likely both cardenolides and pyrrolizidine alkaloids contribute to the unpalatability of D. chrysippus to different extents depending on the population.

Because the plain tiger is unpalatable (also called inedible), they are aposematic - their bright coloration serves as a warning to predators that they are either distasteful or toxic. Consequently, once a predator has made the mistake of attempting to eat a plain tiger, they will refrain in the future from attacking similarly colored butterflies. This has led to the evolution of a number of other species which mimic the plain tiger in order to co-opt the protection conferred by such bright coloration.

Batesian mimicry 
Batesian mimics are palatable species which mimic unpalatable species, and D. chrysippus is a model for several Batesian mimics, including H. misippus, P. poggei, M. marshalli, and P. dardanus in east Africa. Batesian mimicry is only effective so long as the mimic is less common than the model, or predators will learn that the mimics are in fact edible and then attempt to eat the similar-looking unpalatable butterflies.

Müllerian mimicry 
Müllerian mimicry occurs when multiple species which are all unpalatable evolve to resemble one another. In this case, the relative abundance of each species does not have a deleterious effect on any others, because a predator which eats any one of them will be deterred from eating any similar-looking butterflies. In Uganda, D. chrysippus has several Müllerian mimics, including A. encedon and A. encedana.

Genetics

Subspecies 
Despite the external similarity, the common tiger (D. genutia) is not closely related to the plain tiger. Three subspecies were considered valid in a 2005 review:

 Danaus chrysippus chrysippus
 Asia, Mediterranean region, northern tropical Africa
 Danaus chrysippus alcippus (Cramer, 1777) - formerly D. c. aegyptius
 From the Cape Verde Islands through tropical Africa to Yemen and Oman. Browner with broader white forewing spots.
 Danaus chrysippus orientis (Aurivillius, 1909) - formerly D. c. liboria
 Saint Helena, southern tropical Africa to South Africa, Madagascar, Comoros, Seychelles and Mascarenes. Small white forewing spots.

D. c. alcippus is well on the way of becoming a distinct species.

On the other hand, the former subspecies petilia is nowadays recognized as a good species, the lesser wanderer (D. petilia). More enigmatic is the status of the former subspecies (or forms) dorippus and bataviana. These are tentatively also regarded as a distinct species, the dorippus tiger (D. dorippus).

However, it appears (from analysis of mtDNA sequences, which are only inherited from the mother) that the dorippus tiger is the product of an ancient lineage of Danaus hybridizing with plain tiger females. As the plain tiger is known to be parasitized at least occasionally by Spiroplasma bacteria which selectively kill off male hosts, a subsequent scarcity of plain tiger males might have led to this hybridization and the evolution of the dorippus tiger. From the colour pattern of this species, it can be assumed that the ancient lineage had no black apex on the forewings, as this characteristic is still absent in D. dorippus.

The presumed subspecies cratippus most likely belongs to either the lesser wanderer or the dorippus tiger, but confirmation of its taxonomic status requires more research. In any case, these three species are closely related; their closest relatives, in turn, might be the soldier (D. eresimus) and queen (D. gilippus) butterflies.

Several local forms have been described from Asia:

 Danaus chrysippus chrysippus f. alcippoides
 The upper hindwing is more or less very white; about half of the individuals have a second submarginal spot in the forewing. Occasionally found in South-East Asia, very rarely in India.
 Danaus chrysippus chrysippus f. gelderi
 The upper hindwing has white markings. Occasionally found on Sulawesi.
 Danaus chrysippus chrysippus f. bowringi
 The upper hindwing has a subapical band composed of somewhat larger spots, and an additional forewing spot as in f. alcippoides is always present. Found throughout the eastern parts of this subspecies' range.

On the other hand, the plethora of named taxa from Africa are apparently F1 or F2 hybrids between the plain tiger subspecies (the contact zone of which is in the general area of Uganda) and/or D. dorippus:

 Danaus chrysippus × alcippoides
 is D. c. chrysippus × D. c. alcippus
 Danaus × transiens, Danaus × klugii, Danaus × albinus and Danaus × semialbinus
 are D. c. alcippus × D. dorippus

Genomes 
When D. chrysippus was analyzed via a sample from Kampala, Uganda, it was found that the population was undergoing a significant level of evolutionary change. Three loci were examined, and genotypic frequency differences found at two of the three suggested that opposing selective forces, likely pertaining to Mullerian and Batesian mimicry, acting on males and females is contributing to a balanced polymorphism.

Courtship and mating 

In addition to conferring protection from predators, pyrrolizidine alkaloids are necessary in the mating ritual of D. chrysippus. Male plain tigers use the alkaloids to synthesize pheromones which are stored in hair-pencils sheathed in alar organs, which are specialized scales on top of the hindwing. The hair-pencils are fanned out during courtship to release these pheromones, and this appears to be necessary for attracting females. Males deprived of pyrrolizidine alkaloids in their diet are considerably less successful in mating; mating appears to occur preferentially between butterflies of the same subspecies, so coloration is likely also an important signal in the mating process. Female plain tigers have been recorded as mating up to four times.

See also 

 List of butterflies of India
 List of butterflies of India (Nymphalidae)
 List of butterflies of India (Danainae)

References 

 
 
 
 
 Gil-T., Felipe (2006): A new hostplant for Danaus plexippus L. in Europe. A study of cryptic preimaginal polymorphism within Danaus chrysippus L. in southern Spain (Andalusia) (Lepidoptera, Nymphalidae, Danainae). ISSN 0171-0079 | Atalanta 37 (1/2): 143–149, 279. Full article: .
 HOSTS (2007): A Database of the World's Lepidopteran Hostplants. Retrieved 2007-AUG-01.
 
 
 Larsen, Torben (1994): Butterflies of Egypt. Saudi Aramco World, issue 5 (September/October): 24–27.

External links 
 AdaMerOs - Butterflies Watching & Photography Society in Turkey
 Sri Lanka Wild Information Database

Danaus (butterfly)
Butterflies of Africa
Butterflies of Asia
Butterflies of Europe
Butterflies of Indochina
Butterflies of Java
Butterflies of Singapore
Insects of Cape Verde
Insects of Egypt
Insects of Pakistan
Art of ancient Egypt
Butterflies described in 1758
Taxa named by Carl Linnaeus